Arotria is a genus of moths in the family Gelechiidae.

Species
Arotria iophaea Meyrick, 1904

References

Dichomeridinae
Moth genera